St. Lucie Public Schools, previously known as St. Lucie County Public Schools, is the branding for St. Lucie County School District, which is the school district that manages schools in St. Lucie County, Florida, United States. Whereas, the total staff in the district consists of over 6,500 teachers and 2,300 administration staff.

Schools

Elementary schools
 Bayshore Elementary
 Chester A. Moore Elementary
 Fairlawn Elementary (Magnet school)
 Floresta Elementary
 Frances K. Sweet Elementary (Magnet school)
 Lakewood Park Elementary
 Lawnwood Elementary
 Mariposa Elementary
 Morningside Elementary
 Parkway Elementary
 Rivers Edge Elementary
 St. Lucie Elementary
 Savanna Ridge Elementary
 Village Green Environmental Studies School
 Weatherbee Elementary
 White City Elementary
 Windmill Point Elementary

K-8 schools
 Allapattah Flats K-8
 Creative Arts Academy of St. Lucie (Magnet school)
 Manatee K-8
 Northport K-8
 Oak Hammock K-8
 Palm Pointe Educational Research School at Tradition
 Samuel S. Gaines Academy of Emerging Technologies
 St. Lucie West K-8
 West Gate K-8

Middle schools
 Dan McCarty Middle School
 Forest Grove Middle
 Southern Oaks Middle
 Southport Middle school

High schools
 Fort Pierce Central High School
 Fort Pierce Westwood Academy
 Lincoln Park Academy, 6–12 (Magnet school)
 Mosaic Digital Academy Virtual School K–12
 Port St. Lucie High School
 St. Lucie West Centennial High School
 Treasure Coast High School

Alternative education
 Dale Cassens Education Complex PK–12

References

External links
 

School districts in Florida
Education in St. Lucie County, Florida